Ange de Saint Joseph (secular name: Joseph de la Brosse; b. 1636 in Toulouse – d. 1697 in Perpignan) was a French missionary friar of the Order of Discalced Carmelites. He was a linguist, and wrote works on Oriental pharmacology.

Life

In 1662 he took up the study of Arabic in the convent of San Pancrazio in Rome, under Celestino à San-Liduvina, brother of the Orientalist Golius. In 1664 he was sent to the East as missionary, and while visiting Smyrna, Greece, and Ispahan, Iran, was instructed in Persian by Balthazar, a Portuguese Carmelite. 

He passed ten years in Persia and Arabia, acting as prior at Ispahan and, later, at Basra, Iraq. On the capture of the latter place by the Ottoman Turks, he went to Constantinople, Turkey and succeeded in gaining for his mission the protection of the Sultan, through the mediation of the French ambassador.

He was recalled to Rome in 1679, and in 1680 was made superior of missions in the Netherlands, England, and Ireland, where he spent many years. He was Provincial in his order at the time of his death.

Works

His writings are: 

Pharmacopoeia Persica, ex idiomate persico in latinum conversa. Paris, 1681. 

Hyde (Biographia Britannica, cited by Langlès, Biographie universelle) asserts that the credit for this work really belongs to Père Matthieu. 

Another work by Ange de Saint Joseph, which is praised by Bernier, Pétis de la Croix, and Chardin is 

Gazophylacium linguæ Persarum, Amsterdam, 1684 (a grammar with a dictionary in Latin, Italian, and French).

References

Attribution
 The entry cites:
MARTALIS A SCO. JOANNE-BAPTISTA, Bibl. Script. Carmel. excalceatorum; 
Nicéron, Mémoires, XXIX, 26.

1636 births
1697 deaths
Carmelites
French Roman Catholic missionaries
Clergy from Toulouse
Roman Catholic missionaries in Iraq
Roman Catholic missionaries in Turkey
Roman Catholic missionaries in Iran
French expatriates in Iraq
French expatriates in Iran
French expatriates in Turkey
Latin-language writers from France